Garreth McLellan (born 9 January 1982) is a South African professional mixed martial artist who most recently competed in the Middleweight division of the EFC. A professional since 2009, he was one of the first South African MMA fighters to compete in the UFC.

Background
Born and raised in South Africa, McLellan began training in karate at the age of nine and also played rugby union. At the age of 19, McLellan was playing flanker for the Crusaders Rugby Club in Durban when he was offered a contract to compete for the Natal Sharks. Working with Jason Vorster, the team's fitness coach and an MMA trainer, McLellan would eventually make the transition to mixed martial arts. In karate, McLellan was a national champion and also won a national title in grappling.

Mixed martial arts career

Early career
McLellan compiled an amateur record of 10–0 before making his professional debut in 2009, competing exclusively for regional promotions in his native South Africa, and was a two-time EFC AFRICA champion. He compiled a professional record of 12–2, before signing with the UFC in December 2014.

Ultimate Fighting Championship
McLellan made his promotional debut against Bartosz Fabiński on 11 April 2015 at UFC Fight Night 64.  He lost the fight via unanimous decision.

McLellan faced Bubba Bush on 24 October 2015 at UFC Fight Night 76. He won the fight via TKO in the closing seconds of the third round.

McLellan next faced Magnus Cedenblad on 8 May 2016 at UFC Fight Night 87. He lost the fight via TKO in the second round.

McLellan was defeated by Alessio Di Chirico on 27 August 2016 at UFC on Fox 21. He lost the fight via split decision.

McLellan faced promotional newcomer Paulo Costa on 11 March 2017 at UFC Fight Night 106. He lost the fight via TKO in the first round.

Championships and accomplishments

Extreme Fighting Championship (EFC)
EFC Middleweight World Championship (Two times)
Two title defences

Mixed martial arts record

|-
|Loss
|align=center|13–7
|Brendan Lesar
|KO (punch)
|EFC Africa 80
|
|align=center|1
|align=center|3:06
|Sibaya, South Africa
|
|-
|Loss
|align=center|13–6
|Paulo Costa
|TKO (punches)
|UFC Fight Night: Belfort vs. Gastelum
|
|align=center|1
|align=center|1:17
|Fortaleza, Brazil
|
|-
|Loss
|align=center|13–5 
|Alessio Di Chirico
| Decision (split)
|UFC on Fox: Maia vs. Condit
|
|align=center|3
|align=center|5:00
|Vancouver, British Columbia, Canada
|  
|-
|Loss
|align=center|13–4
|Magnus Cedenblad
|TKO (head kick and punches)
|UFC Fight Night: Overeem vs. Arlovski
|
|align=center|2
|align=center|0:47
|Rotterdam, Netherlands
|
|-
|Win
|align=center|13–3
| Bubba Bush
|TKO (punches)
|UFC Fight Night: Holohan vs. Smolka
|
|align=center|3
|align=center|4:58
|Dublin, Ireland
|
|-
|Loss
|align=center|12–3
|Bartosz Fabiński
|Decision (unanimous)
|UFC Fight Night: Gonzaga vs. Cro Cop 2
|
|align=center|3
|align=center|5:00
|Kraków, Poland
|
|-
|Win
|align=center|12–2
|Dricus du Plessis
|Submission (guillotine choke)
|EFC Africa 33
|
|align=center|3
|align=center|1:44
|Durban, South Africa
|
|-
|Win
|align=center|11–2
|J.P. Kruger
|Submission (rear-naked choke)
|EFC Africa 28
|
|align=center|1
|align=center|3:05
|Gauteng, South Africa
|
|-
|Win
|align=center|10–2
|Jeremy Smith
|Submission (rear-naked choke)
|EFC Africa 24
|
|align=center|1
|align=center|N/A
|Gauteng, South Africa
|
|-
|Win
|align=center|9–2
|Tumelo Muphutha
|Decision (split)
|EFC Africa 20
|
|align=center|3
|align=center|5:00
|Gauteng, South Africa
|
|-
|Win
|align=center|8–2
|Armand de Bruyn
|Submission (rear-naked choke)
|EFC Africa 15
|
|align=center|1
|align=center|1:22
|Gauteng, South Africa
|
|-
|Win
|align=center|7–2
|Danie van Heerden
|Submission (rear-naked choke)
|EFC Africa 14
|
|align=center|2
|align=center|3:08
|Gauteng, South Africa
|
|-
|Loss
|align=center|6–2
|Jeremy Smith
|Submission (guillotine choke)
|EFC Africa 12
|
|align=center|4
|align=center|0:56
|Gauteng, South Africa
|Lost the EFC Middleweight Championship.
|-
|Win
|align=center|6–1
|Jacques Joubert
|Submission (guillotine choke)
|EFC Africa 8
|
|align=center|4
|align=center|3:14
|Gauteng, South Africa
|
|-
|Win
|align=center|5–1
|Wade Henderson
|Submission (rear-naked choke)
|EFC Africa 5
|
|align=center|2
|align=center|3:38
|Gauteng, South Africa
|
|-
|Win
|align=center|4–1
|Warren Allison
|Submission (armbar)
|EFC Africa 3
|
|align=center|1
|align=center|N/A
|Gauteng, South Africa
|
|-
|Win
|align=center|3–1
|Juan Lubbe
|KO (punches)
|EFC Africa 2
|
|align=center|1
|align=center|N/A
|Gauteng, South Africa
|
|-
|Win
|align=center|2–1
|Barry Britz
|TKO (punches)
|EFC Africa 1
|
|align=center|1
|align=center|N/A
|Gauteng, South Africa
|
|-
|Loss
|align=center|1–1
|Wade Henderson
|TKO (punches)
|Fight Force 1
|
|align=center|1
|align=center|N/A
|Gauteng, South Africa
|
|-
|Win
|align=center|1–0
|J.P. Kruger
|Submission (armbar)
|XFC Africa: Fight Club
|
|align=center|1
|align=center|1:20
|Gauteng, South Africa
|
|-

See also
 List of current UFC fighters
 List of male mixed martial artists

References

External links

1982 births
Living people
South African male mixed martial artists
South African practitioners of Brazilian jiu-jitsu
People awarded a black belt in Brazilian jiu-jitsu
Sportspeople from Johannesburg
South African male karateka
Middleweight mixed martial artists
Mixed martial artists utilizing karate
Mixed martial artists utilizing Brazilian jiu-jitsu
Ultimate Fighting Championship male fighters